Sagunto Castle is a fortress overlooking the town of Sagunto, near Valencia in Spain. The site's history extends back over two thousand years and includes Iberian, Roman and medieval remains. During the Islamic period, the castle was known as Murbĩtar and Morvedre. The castle was declared a National Monument in 1931.

The sacking of the Iberian settlement by Hannibal in 219 BC led to the outbreak of the Second Punic War. The visible walls are largely Islamic in origin, with substantial modifications taking place after the end of Islamic rule, with the defences being strengthened and modernised. In 1811, during the Napoleonic Wars, the French laid siege to the castle, and were ultimately successful in taking it, after which the defences were repaired.

Location

Etymology
The original Iberian name for the city was Arse. Sagunto was originally recorded as a Roman municipium in the middle of the 1st century BC, as the Municipium Saguntinum, or simply Saguntum. During the reign of Wamba, king of the Visigoths, the old Roman municipium became referred to as Sagunto, and it continued under this name until 711 AD, and the end of the Visigoth kingdom. During the Muslim domination of Spain, the Mozarabs referred to the town as Murum Veterum, the "old wall", a name already in use by the 11th century. In time this form was contracted and corrupted into forms such as Murvetrum, Morvedre, and Molvedre, and the Muslims modified this into Murbiter. Christian documents from the 11th century use the form Murus Vetulus.

Description

The site occupies a hilltop overlooking the Mediterranean Sea, and is surrounded by defensive walls. The castle is divided into seven main sections or plazas. The principal divisions are the Plaza de Armas, Plaza de Almenara, Plaza de los Nueve Pilares, Plaza de San Fernando, Plaza de los Estudiantes, Plaza de la Ciudadela and Plaza del Espolón. The visible ruins are essentially those of the Muslim citadel, with later modifications under Christian rule, and finally by French engineers during the Peninsular War.

Curtain wall
The curtain wall mostly dates to the Islamic period; it descended from the castle to connect to a series of fortifications laid out around the town below. It underwent substantial modifications from the Christian period through to the Peninsular War, with Gothic and Renaissance reworking of Muslim fortifications. A number of towers and bastions survive, mostly dating to the 18th century.

Plaza del Refectorio
The Plaza del Refectorio is the smallest of the plazas, situated in the centre of the castle upon an elevation that also supports the Reina Gobernadora battery. The Plaza del Refectorio takes its name from a number of vaulted arcades that were used as refectories. Its east side is formed by the refectory building; it is bordered on the south side by the curtain wall, on the west by a ruined double wall and a Roman tower, and on the north by a fortified wall. A corridor running between the Plaza del Refectorio and the battery links the Plaza de Armas with the Plaza de San Fernando.

Roman remains

The Plaza de Armas is accessed via an Islamic arch. Remains of the Iberian defensive wall are visible on the east side of the castle.
The foundations of the Roman forum, together with those of some Iberian buildings, and those of a Roman temple or capitolium, are all located in the forum area of the castle, upon the hilltop. The plaza was fronted on the west side by a basilica that measured . The east side of the square was lined by a row of tabernae (shops). To the south of the plaza is a well-preserved cistern, and the base of the temple or capitolium are on the north side. The temple measured . A complex building was situated on the northeast side of the plaza; it has not been securely identified but it may have been a curia (assembly or court building) or a temple of Augustus. Since it possessed two large parallel chambers, it may have served both functions. The remains of a Roman theatre stand some  down the hillside to the northwest of the forum. The cistern is likely to have been built when the city was rebuilt after the Second Punic War.

The Roman forum was excavated in 1985. The original forum dated to the Late Republican period, and was largely demolished in the Early Imperial period in order to build a new forum. The replacement was built during the reign of Augustus, and paid for by Gnaeus Baebius Geminus, a local aristocrat. The hilltop was levelled, and retaining walls reinforced by buttresses supported the artificial platform that served as a foundation for the forum. On the north side of the forum, the retaining walls and buttressing are still visible.

History

The site was apparently first settled by the Iberians in the early Iron Age. These early inhabitants belonged to the Edetani tribe. As the Carthaginian Empire expanded, the inhabitants formed a defensive alliance with Rome. The Carthaginian general Hannibal sacked the Iberian settlement in 219 BC, an action that led to the outbreak of the Second Punic War. In 214 BC, the Romans took Sargunto from the Carthaginians. Between 175 and 100 BC, the Romans built a temple or capitolium on the hill. A water cistern was built close to the temple, and was later incorporated into the Imperial forum, in the 1st century AD. The history of the castle during the Islamic period is poorly studied, with Sagunto being overshadowed by Valencia during that time. It was during the Islamic period that the Albacar portion of the castle was built, as well as most of the outer wall. 8th century Arab records from the reign of Abd al-Rahman I (ruled 755–788 AD) indicate that Sagunto fell within the jurisdiction of Tortosa at that time, rather than that of Valencia. Muslim historian Ibn Hayyan recorded that the castle was taken by force in 929–930, and mentions it again, under its Arab name, as submitting to the sultan Abd-ar-Rahman III in 933 AD. Sagunto Castle was used as a fortress by the Muslims to defend the regions of Catalonia and Valencia. It was seized and occupied by El Cid from 1098 to 1102, and was definitively removed from Muslim rule by Christian king Jaume I in 1238, who incorporated it into the Kingdom of Valencia. By the mid-13th century, the castle was garrisoned by Christians, although the majority of the town's inhabitants were still Muslims.

By the early 14th century, Sagunto (still known as Morvedre) had a growing Jewish population, resulting in the establishment of a Jewish cemetery under the castle walls in 1328. Peter IV of Aragon reinforced the castle defences in the 14th century. In 1363, King Peter of Castile took the castle after laying siege to it. In 1562, Juan Bautista Antonelli was commissioned by King Philip II of Spain to improve and modernise the castle's defences; it was at this time that the castle precinct was divided into seven plazas. During the Spanish War of Succession, in the early 18th century, the castle was surrendered to the Archduke of Austria, but soon afterwards it passed under the control of King Philip V of Spain. In 1811, during the Peninsular War, Brigadier Andriani defended the castle against French troops commanded by General Suchet, who laid siege to the fortress on 23 September of that year. Andriani withstood the siege and several assaults, although Suchet was ultimately victorious. After taking the castle, Suchet ordered it to be repaired and strengthened the defences. These modifications were overseen by Andriani.

In 1932, M. González Simancas excavated the general area of the Roman remains in the Plaza de Armas, but left few records of his investigations.

Notes

References

Agència Valenciana del Turisme (2016). Castillo de Sagunto. Valencia, Spain: Generalitat Valenciana. Archived from the original on 2016-09-06. Retrieved 2017-03-28. 
Aranegui Gascó, Carmen (1984). La cisterna del flanco septentrional del foro de Saguntum. SAGVNTVM, 18, pp. 195–203. Valencia, Spain: Departament de Prehistòria i Arqueologia de la Universitat de València. . . 
Baixauli i Bach, Vicent (2013). Alberg per a estudiosos i viatgers al Castell de Sagunt. Valencia, Spain: Escola Tècnica Superior d’Arquitectura de València, Universitat Politècnica de València 
Carruana Martínez, José Ángel; Manuel Civera i Gómez (2000). El gliptograma de la porta nord de la Plaça del Refectori del Castell de Sagunt. Revista ARSE, 34, pp. 17–30. Sagunto, Spain: Centro Arqueológico Saguntino. 
Centro Arqueológico Saguntino (1972). Aspectos gráficos del Castillo de Sagunto. Revista ARSE, 12, pp. 35–36/67-68. Sagunto, Spain: Centro Arqueológico Saguntino. 
Chabret, Antonio (2008) [1901]. Sagunto. Nomenclator de las calles, plazas y puertas antiguas y modernas de la ciudad. Valladolid, Spain: Editorial MAXTOR. . 
Collins, Roger (1998). Spain: An Oxford Archaeological Guide. Oxford, England: Oxford University Press. .
Franco Sánchez, Francisco (2006). Sagunto/Murbĩtar en el período islámico: Su historia a través de los textos. De Murbiter a Morvedre. Valencia and Alicante, Spain: Fundación Bancaja and Universidad de Alicante. .  
Gates, David (2001) [1986]. The Spanish Ulcer: A History of the Peninsular War. Cambridge, Massachusetts, US: Da Capo Press. .
Mateu y Llopis, Felipe (1983), Del Municipium Saguntinum al Morvedre mozárabe. Revista ARSE, 18, pp. 23–28/361-366. Sagunto, Spain: Centro Arqueológico Saguntino. 
Meyerson, Mark D. (2004). Jews in an Iberian Frontier Kingdom: Society, Economy, and Politics in Morvedre, 1248–1391. Leiden, Netherlands: Brill. . .
Tourist Info Sagunto. Sagunto Histórico: 26 Castillo. Sagunto, Spain: Oficina de Turismo. Retrieved 2017-03-30.

Further reading

Ajuntament de Sagunt (2016). Estrategia de desarrollo urbano sostenible integrada Sagunt: Anexo II: Historia de Sagunto. Sagunto, Spain: Ayuntamiento de Sagunto. 
Aranegui Gascó, Carmen (1991). Un templo republicano en el centro cívico de Sagunto. Cuadernos de Arquitectura Romana, 1: Templos romanos de Hispania, pp. 67–82. Murcia, Spain: Universidad de Murcia. . 
Díaz Borrás, Andrés (1998–1999). Las obras de conservación del castillo de Sagunto a lo largo del siglo XV (primera parte). Revisa ARSE, 32–33, pp. 125–154. Sagunto, Spain: Centro Arqueológico Saguntino. 
Díaz Borrás, Andrés (2000). La conservación del castillo de Sagunto a lo largo del siglo XV (segunda parte). Revisa ARSE, 34, pp. 79–107. Sagunto, Spain: Centro Arqueológico Saguntino. 
Pascual Buyé, Ignacio; Carmen Aranegui Gascó (1993). Una torre defensiva de época republicana en el Castell de Sagunt. SAGVNTVM, 26, pp. 189–203. Valencia, Spain: Departament de Prehistòria i Arqueologia de la Universitat de València. . . 
Roca Ribelles, Facundo (2006). Grafitos en la muralla del castillo de Sagunto. Revista ARSE, 40, pp. 65–69. Sagunto, Spain: Centro Arqueológico Saguntino. 
Rouillard, Pierre (1977). Nota preliminar sobre las excavaciones en la pendiente sur del cerro del castillo de Sagunto. SAGVNTVM, 12, pp. 145–150.  Valencia, Spain: Departament de Prehistòria i Arqueologia de la Universitat de València. . . 

Castles in the Valencian Community
Roman sites in Spain
Iberians
Moorish architecture in Spain
Peninsular War
Second Punic War
Jewish Spanish history
Alcazars and Alcazabas in Spain
Sagunto